The SERI microalgae culture collection was a collection from the Department of Energy's Aquatic Species Program cataloged at the Solar Energy Research Institute located in Golden, Colorado. The Aquatic Species Program ended in 1996 after its funding was cut, at which point its microalgae collection was moved to the University of Hawaii. In 1998 the University of Hawaii, partnered with the University of California at Berkeley, received a grant from the National Science Foundation (NSF), for their proposal to develop commercial, medical, and industrial uses of microalgae, as well as new and more efficient techniques for cultivation. This grant was used to form Marine Bioproduct Engineering Center (MarBEC), a facility operating within the University system of Hawaii at Manoa, but connected to corporate interests.

Below is a list of the algal-strains in the microalgae culture collection from the closeout report of the Department of Energy's Aquatic Species Program.

References 
www.eere.energy.gov Department of Energy Aquatic Species Program; Biodiesel Production from Algae.

See also 
 Algaculture
 List of algal culture collections
 Algal nutrient solutions
 Aquatic Species Program

Algaculture
Microbiology organizations
High lipid content microalgae
Culture collections